Morris Jefferson (born Chicago, Illinois, United States) is an American disco/funk performer who produced only two known albums. His first, Spank Your Blank Blank, was released in 1978 on Parachute Records. It was a collection of rousing and highly danceable disco funk gems, whose titles revolve around the theme of "spank": "To Spank With Love," "Spank Your Thang," "Dr. Spank," et al. The record producers, writers, and arrangers for this release were Jerline Shelton and Maurice Commander; executive producer was Lucky Cordell. Two singles were released from the album: "Spank Your Blank Blank" (1977), which went to No. 34 on the US Billboard R&B chart in 1978; and "To Spank with Love / Spank Your Thang". In 1980, he released a single "One More Time / " It's The Last Time Around For Me", on the Good Luck record label.

Morris Jefferson released a second album in 1984 entitled Rock Out!

Over the past twenty years, Jefferson has turned his attention to performing gospel music in various religious settings.

See also
List of disco artists (L–R)
List of Soul Train episodes

References

Living people
Year of birth missing (living people)
21st-century African-American male singers
American disco singers
American funk singers
Musicians from Chicago